Mount Cornu is a mountain standing at the head of Gregory Glacier and north of Breguet Glacier, in northern Graham Land. It was shown on an Argentine government chart of 1957, but named by the UK Antarctic Place-Names Committee in 1960 for Paul Cornu, a French engineer who, in a machine of his own construction, was the first man to leave the ground successfully, although not vertically, in a helicopter.

Mt Cornu was first climbed and descended on ski on January 19, 2012, from the Breguet Glacier via the west-south-west face by all members of the Eagle Ski Club Antarctic Expedition led by Phil Wickens, who ascertained the height to be 1714m.

References
 

Mountains of Graham Land
Davis Coast